Constantin Adrian Blid (born 18 October 1967) is a Romanian former professional footballer who played as a goalkeeper.

References

External links
 

1967 births
Living people
Footballers from Bucharest
Romanian footballers
Association football goalkeepers
Liga I players
Liga II players
FC Inter Sibiu players
FC Steaua București players
FC Bihor Oradea players
FC Progresul București players
FC Rapid București players
FC Politehnica Timișoara players
CSM Ceahlăul Piatra Neamț players
ASC Daco-Getica București players
FC Argeș Pitești players